Stevi Schnoor (born September 14, 1985) is a Canadian American football and rugby football player who represented Canada at the 2017 Women's Rugby League World Cup.

Playing career
From British Columbia, Schnoor attended Simon Fraser University and is a teacher.

Schnoor played inside centre in rugby union at high school and was selected for the national team for the 2009 Nations Cup. She played in three test matches and also played rugby sevens at tournaments in Calgary, Cuba and Las Vegas.

She then played for the BC Angels and the Seattle Mist (and in one season Nashville Knights) in the Legends Football League as a running back and a linebacker.

Schnoor later switched to rugby league and represented the Canada Ravens at the 2017 Women's Rugby League World Cup.

References

Canadian female rugby union players
Canadian female rugby league players
Canada women's national rugby league team players
Canada international rugby sevens players
Female rugby sevens players
Canada international rugby union players
Sportspeople from British Columbia
Canadian players of American football
Legends Football League players
Simon Fraser University alumni
1985 births
Living people